Evangelists may refer to:

 Evangelists (Christianity), Christians who specialize in evangelism
 Four Evangelists, the authors of the four Gospel accounts in the New Testament
 The Evangelists, a controversial play

See also

 Evangelist (disambiguation)